Quadrimermis is a genus of nematodes belonging to the family Mermithidae.

Species:
 Quadrimermis coramnica Coman, 1961 
 Quadrimermis lovatensis Rubzov, 1979 
 Quadrimermis pikkjarvensis Rubzov, 1979 
 Quadrimermis vyrtsjarvi Rubzov, 1978

References

Mermithidae